Palkon Ki Chhaon Mein is a 1977 Indian Hindi-language drama film, produced by Nariman Baria and A. Khalia under the Nav Sampathi Productions banner and directed by Meraj. The film stars Rajesh Khanna, Hema Malini while Jeetendra has given a special appearance and music composed by Laxmikant Pyarelal. It received 4 of 5 stars from critics in Bollywood Guide Collections. The film was critically acclaimed and became an unexpected flop at the box office. However over the years, the film has been appreciated by the audiences in its screening on television and has gained a cult following over the years. Welcome to Sajjanpur, a film inspired by Palkon Ki Chhaon Mein, became a hit at the box office in 2008.

Plot 
Ravi is a well-educated, unemployed guy. His mother (Pratima Devi) wants her son to get a job. One day Ravi goes to the post office to collect his father's pension and the postmaster mistakes him for a job candidate. After a joyful conversation, the postmaster offers Ravi a job of a postman and he happily accepts. As a result, Ravi has to go to a village named Sitapur for the job. There he finds Mohini always waiting for a letter. Eventually, Ravi and Mohini become friends. There is an old woman in the village who lost her son in the partition and has since become insane. Ravi and Mohini's friendship develops and Ravi falls in love with Mohini. A tanga driver Nathu has a strong interest in Ravi and Mohini.

One day Mohini asks Ravi for his measurements so that she can knit him a sweater. Ravi misunderstands that Mohini is in love with him. Another day, Mohini gets angry with Ravi that he never brings a letter for her. Next day, Ravi writes a letter to Mohini proposing to her and hands it to her. Suddenly, Mohini tells him that she had been waiting for this letter as it belongs to her husband. Ravi is heartbroken. In the flashback, it is shown that Mohini loves a soldier also named Ravi. He has promised Mohini that he will return from the war, but had not returned. Ravi hands her the letter and returns to his home. Ravi also sets out to search for that guy, but gets no clue.

After that, Ravi goes to his mother where his mother asks him not to lie to anyone in the village. When he returns, the old woman asks him to read a letter which has news of her son's death. Ravi speaks the truth.

On the same day, he receives a telegram saying that the soldier is dead. He goes to inform Mohini, but learns that the old lady is dead because he spoke the truth. Ravi returns without saying a word. Meanwhile, Mohini is very happy. Ravi goes to Mohini's house, but can't dare to speak. At night, Mohini comes to Ravi and asks him why he came today. Ravi tells her the truth and next morning she tries to commit suicide. Afraid for Mohini, her mother asks Ravi to accompany them to Khetpur where she is going for Mohini's marriage.

In the journey, Ravi tells Mohini that he loved her and because of this, he can't tell her the truth of her lover's death. Mohini feels very upset. Ravi accompanies them to Khetpur. Just when he was leaving, Mohini gets hit on the stairs and falls on the ground. Ravi runs to save her. Suddenly, Ravi's mother steps out. Ravi and his mother stare each other in astonishment. Ravi's mother tells him that she has come to fix his marriage with Mohini. Ravi and Mohini are filled with joy and the film ends.

Cast 
 Rajesh Khanna as Ravi Raj Sinha (Dakiya Babu)
 Hema Malini as Mohini
 Jeetendra as Ravi (Soldier)
 Rekha as Dancer (Guest Appearance)
 Amjad Khan as Nathu
 Asrani as Raghu
 Farida Jalal as Chutki
 Kanhaiyalal
 Leela Mishra as Mohini's mother
 Master Rajoo as Parcel
 Pratima Devi as Ravi's mother
 Dhumal
 Shahid Bijnori
 Sharma
 Sunder
 Leela Chitnis

Soundtrack

References

External links 
 

1977 films
Indian romantic drama films
1977 romantic drama films
1970s Hindi-language films
Films scored by Laxmikant–Pyarelal